Glenroy Lajon Samuel (born 29 November 1994) is a Kittian international footballer who plays for Conaree, as a midfielder.

Club career
Samuel has played club football for Conaree. Following a SKNFA Premier League match against Village Superstars on 20 April 2019, Samuel stabbed opposing player Raheem Francis. He was charged with attempted murder and released on bail.

International career
At the youth level, he played in 2011 CONCACAF U-17 Championship qualification, where he scored six goals, and 2015 CONCACAF Men's Olympic Qualifying Championship qualification.

He made his senior international debut for Saint Kitts and Nevis in 2016.

References

1994 births
Living people
Saint Kitts and Nevis footballers
Saint Kitts and Nevis international footballers
Saint Kitts and Nevis youth international footballers
Association football midfielders
Conaree FC players